The Opel Corsa R5 is a R5 regulations rally car built by Opel. It is based upon the Opel Corsa road car and is built to and was launched in 2017.

References

All-wheel-drive vehicles
Corsa R5
R5 cars